The Sportime Randall's Island Tennis Center is a tennis facility located in Randalls Island Park in New York City.  It is the home of the New York Sportimes team of World TeamTennis (WTT).

External links
 

Sports venues in Manhattan
World TeamTennis stadiums
Tennis venues in New York City